Kristin Lavransdatter is a 1995 Norwegian film directed by Liv Ullmann, featuring Elisabeth Matheson, Bjørn Skagestad, Jørgen Langhelle, Lena Endre and Sverre Anker Ousdal, based on Kristin Lavransdatter by Sigrid Undset. The film was selected as the Norwegian entry for the Best Foreign Language Film at the 68th Academy Awards, but was not accepted as a nominee.

See also 
 List of historical drama films
 List of submissions to the 68th Academy Awards for Best Foreign Language Film
 List of Norwegian submissions for the Academy Award for Best Foreign Language Film

References

External links 
 

1995 films
Norwegian drama films
1990s Norwegian-language films
1995 drama films
Films directed by Liv Ullmann
Films set in the 14th century
Films set in Norway
Films based on Norwegian novels